Jazz Abroad is a split album by American jazz drummer Roy Haynes and Quincy Jones with tracks recorded in Sweden in 1953 and 1954 and released by EmArcy.

Reception

Allmusic awarded the album 3 stars.

Track listing
Side A: 
 "Pogo Stick" (Quincy Jones) - 6:20
 "Liza (All the Clouds'll Roll Away)" (George Gershwin, Ira Gershwin, Gus Kahn) - 5:36
 "Jones' Bones" (Jones) - 5:42
 "Sometimes I'm Happy" (Irving Caesar, Clifford Grey, Vincent Youmans) - 5:54
Side B:
 "Little Leona" (Adrian Acea) - 4:56
 "Miss Mopsy" (Joe Benjamin) - 5:07
 "Gone Again" (Curtis Lewis) - 6:03
 "Hagnes" (Roy Haynes, Sahib Shihab) - 5:29 
Recorded in Stockholm, Sweden on November 10, 1953 (Side A) and October 3, 1954 (Side B)

Personnel 
Side A:
Quincy Jones - arranger, conductor
Art Farmer - trumpet
Jimmy Cleveland - trombone
 Åke Persson - trombone
Arne Domnerus - alto saxophone, clarinet
Lars Gullin - baritone saxophone
Bengt Hallberg - piano
Simon Brehm - bass
Alan Dawson - drums

Side B:
Åke Persson - trombone (tracks 1 & 2)
Bjarne Nerem - tenor saxophone (tracks 1-3)
Ed Gregory - baritone saxophone, alto saxophone (tracks 1-3)
Adrian Acea - piano
Joe Benjamin - bass
Roy Haynes - drums

References 

1955 albums
Roy Haynes albums
Quincy Jones albums
EmArcy Records albums
Albums arranged by Quincy Jones